Kingston upon Hull is a unitary authority in the East Riding of Yorkshire, England. Until 1 April 1996 it was a non-metropolitan district in Humberside.
A third of the Council is elected each year with no election every four years. Since the boundary changes in 2002 until 2018, 59 councillors are elected from 23 wards with each ward electing either 2 or 3 councillors. Following a review, in 2017, by the Local Government Boundary Commission this was reduced to 57 councillors from 21 wards effective from the 2018 elections.

Due to boundary changes every ward and every council seat were up for election on 3 May 2018, new wards "East Carr" and "West Carr" replace East Bransholme and West Bransholme and include part of Sutton Park estate too. Labour, Lib Dems and Conservatives are standing candidates for every seat, Green Party have 9 standing and UKIP five.

Political control
Prior to 1974, Hull was a county borough, independent from any county council. Under the Local Government Act 1972 it became a non-metropolitan district, with Humberside County Council providing county-level services. The first election to the reconstituted city council was held in 1973, initially operating as a shadow authority before coming into its revised powers on 1 April 1974. Humberside County Council was abolished in 1996 and Hull became a unitary authority. Political control of the council since 1973 has been held by the following parties:

Non-metropolitan district

Unitary authority

Leadership
The leaders of the council since 2007 have been:

Council elections

Non-metropolitan district elections
1973 Hull City Council election
1976 Hull City Council election
1979 Hull City Council election
1983 Hull City Council election (New ward boundaries)
1984 Hull City Council election
1986 Hull City Council election
1987 Hull City Council election
1988 Hull City Council election
1990 Hull City Council election
1991 Hull City Council election
1992 Hull City Council election
1994 Hull City Council election

Unitary authority elections
1995 Hull City Council election
1998 Hull City Council election
1999 Hull City Council election
2000 Hull City Council election
2002 Hull City Council election (New ward boundaries reduced the number of seats by one)
2003 Hull City Council election
2004 Hull City Council election
2006 Hull City Council election
2007 Hull City Council election
2008 Hull City Council election
2010 Hull City Council election
2011 Hull City Council election
2012 Hull City Council election
2014 Hull City Council election
2015 Hull City Council election
2016 Hull City Council election
2018 Hull City Council election (New ward boundaries reduced the number of seats by two)
2019 Hull City Council election
2020 Hull City Council election (postponed because of COVID-19 pandemic)
2021 Hull City Council election
2022 Hull City Council election

Wards

2002–2018

2018–

By-election results

1997–2004

2005–present

References

External links
Hull City Council
By-election results 

 
Elections in Kingston upon Hull
Council elections in the East Riding of Yorkshire
Council elections in Humberside
Local government in Kingston upon Hull
Unitary authority elections in England